"Rolling Sevens" is a song by new wave group ABC, released as the third single from their album Skyscraping.

Track listing

UK CD single 
 "Rolling Sevens"
 "Heaven Knows"
 "The Look of Love" (Live)
 "All of My Heart" (Live)

UK promo CD single 
 "Rolling Sevens" (Radio edit)

Chart performance

References

ABC (band) songs
1997 singles
Songs written by Martin Fry
Songs written by Glenn Gregory
Songs written by Keith Lowndes
1997 songs